Sewer socialism was an originally pejorative term for the American socialist movement that centered in Milwaukee, Wisconsin, from around 1892 to 1960. The term was coined by Morris Hillquit at the 1932 Milwaukee convention of the Socialist Party of America as a commentary on the Milwaukee socialists and their perpetual boasting about the excellent public sewer system in the city.

Background 
With the creation of the Socialist Party of America, this group formed the core of an element that favored reformism rather than revolution, de-emphasizing social theory and revolutionary rhetoric in favor of honest government and efforts to improve public health. The sewer socialists fought to clean up what they saw as "the dirty and polluted legacy of the Industrial Revolution", cleaning up neighborhoods and factories with new sanitation systems, city-owned water and power systems and improved education. This approach is sometimes called "constructive socialism". The movement has its origins in the organization of the Social Democratic Party, a precursor to the Socialist Party of America. Even before the creation of the Social Democratic Party, Milwaukee had elected socialist millwright Henry Smith (who had been elected to the legislature under the "Socialist" label) to Congress on the Union Labor ticket in 1886.

Victor Berger and Meta Berger

Victor L. Berger was one of the prime movers of sewer socialism, often compared to Robert La Follette and his representation of progressivism. He was an Austrian Jewish immigrant who published English and German daily newspapers, distributing free copies to every household in Milwaukee before elections. He was the best-known local leader of this tendency. His wife, Meta Berger, was also a prominent socialist activist. In 1910, he became the first of two 20th-century Socialists elected to the House of Representatives, representing Wisconsin's 5th congressional district (the second was Meyer London of New York). Berger was reelected in 1918, but he was barred from his seat in the House because of his trial and conviction under the 1917 Espionage Act for his public remarks opposing intervention in World War I. A special election was called in which Berger again emerged victorious, but he was denied the seat and it was declared vacant. Berger served the 5th district again from 1923 until 1929 and during his tenure introduced proposals for numerous programs that were subsequently adopted, such as old age pensions, unemployment insurance and public housing. Positions advanced by Meta Berger which proved successful included "penny lunches", medical exams for children, and improved working conditions and wages for teachers.

Electoral success 

In 1910, the Socialists won most of the seats in the Milwaukee city council and county board.  This included the first Socialist mayor in the United States, Emil Seidel, who also received the nomination for Vice President on the Socialist Party of America ticket in the 1912 election when the Socialists netted 6% of the vote, their highest-ever percentage. Seidel and Berger both lost their campaigns in 1912, but in 1916 a new socialist mayor was elected, Daniel Hoan, who remained in office until 1940. Socialists never regained total control over the local government as they did in 1910, but they continued to show major influence until the defeat of Daniel Hoan in 1940. The sewer socialists elected one more mayor in Milwaukee, Frank Zeidler, who served for three terms (1948–1960). A member of a socialist party has not been elected mayor of a major American city since the end of Zeidler's tenure, although independent democratic socialist Bernie Sanders was elected mayor of Burlington, Vermont in 1981. In the Democratic Party primary for the 2021 Buffalo mayoral election, self-identified socialist India Walton scored an upset victory over incumbent Byron Brown. However, Brown went on to defeat Walton in the general election as a write-in candidate. Had Walton won, she would have been the first socialist to serve as mayor of a major American city since Zeidler.

In 2022, Milwaukee elected two democratic socialists to the Wisconsin State Assembly, Darrin Madison and Ryan Clancy. Madison and Clancy, who are both members of the Democratic Party, announced they would form an informal Socialist Caucus, the first of its kind in Wisconsin since 1931.

Relationship with the Wisconsin Progressive Party 
Although the Socialists had many ideas and policies similar to those of the Wisconsin Progressives, tensions still existed between the two groups because of their differing ideologies. Socialist Assemblyman George L. Tews during a 1932 debate on unemployment compensation and how to fund it argued for the Socialist bill and against the Progressive substitute, stating that a Progressive was "a Socialist with the brains knocked out". Although as a rule the Progressives and Socialists did not run candidates against each other in Milwaukee, they rarely co-operated on elections. One notable exception was the 1924 presidential campaign of Robert La Follette, who was endorsed by the Socialist Party of America.  A factor that affected this lack of collaboration was the relationship of each party to the Republican Party. Socialists were outright opposed to the party while the Progressives sometimes worked with their parent party.

Heritage 
In 1961, Progressive editor William Evjue wrote of the Wisconsin Socialist legislators he had known by saying: "They never were approached by the lobbyists, because the lobbyists knew it was not possible to influence these men. They were incorruptible."

In 2022, when union organizer Juan Miguel Martinez was elected to join incumbent Ryan Clancy as the second self-proclaimed socialist member of the eighteen-member Milwaukee County board of supervisors (both had been endorsed by the Milwaukee chapter of the Democratic Socialists of America), Martinez and Clancy both cited the sewer socialists as part of the heritage on which they seek to build.

See also 
 Jasper McLevy
 Progressivism in the United States

References

Further reading 
 Beck, Elmer A. The Sewer Socialists: A History of the Socialist Party of Wisconsin, 1897–1940. Fennimore, WI: Westburg Associates, 1982.
 Bekken, Jon. "'No Weapon So Powerful': Working-Class Newspapers in the United States," Journal of Communication Inquiry, Vol. 12, No. 2, pp. 104–119 (1988)
 Johnston, Scott D. "Wisconsin Socialists and the Conference for Progressive Political Action" Wisconsin Magazine of History, vol. 37, no. 2 (Winter, 1953–1954): 96–100.
 Jozwiak, Elizabeth. "Politics in Play: Socialism, Free Speech, and Social Centers in Milwaukee" Wisconsin Magazine of History, vol. 66, no. 4 (Summer, 1983): 10–21.
 Kerstein, Edward S. Milwaukee's All-American Mayor: Portrait of Daniel Webster Hoan. Englewood Cliff, NJ: Prentice-Hall, 1966.
 Lorence, James J. "'Dynamite for the Brain': The Growth and Decline of Socialism in Central and Lakeshore Wisconsin, 1910–1920" Wisconsin Magazine of History, vol. 66, no. 4 (Summer, 1983): 250–273.
 McCarthy, John M. Making Milwaukee Mightier: Planning and the Politics of Growth, 1910–1960.  DeKalb, IL: Northern Illinois University Press, 2009.
 Miller, Sally M. Race, Ethnicity, and Gender in Early Twentieth-Century American Socialism. Garland Reference Library of Social Science, vol. 880. New York and London: Garland Publishing, 1996.
 Olson, Frederick L. "The Socialist Party and the Union in Milwaukee, 1900–1912" Wisconsin Magazine of History, vol. 44, no. 2 (Winter, 1960–1961): 110–116.
 Zeidler, Frank P. A Liberal in City Government: My Experiences as Mayor of Milwaukee. Milwaukee: Milwaukee Publishers, 2005.

External links 
 John Gurda on How the Socialists Saved Milwaukee
 Socialism before it was a four-letter word
 Here, Socialism meant honest, frugal government
 Parsing Out the Legacy of Sewer Socialism

History of Milwaukee
History of socialism
Socialism in the United States
Socialist Party of America
20th century in Wisconsin